Dean Dinwoodey (November 12, 1899 – February 7, 1983) was the first president and chairman of BNA (The Bureau of National Affairs, Inc., now Bloomberg Industry Group) and a noted intellectual property law scholar. The Dean Dinwoodey Center for Intellectual Property Studies at The George Washington University in Washington, D.C., bears his name.

Dinwoodey was born in Idaho Falls, Idaho and received his bachelor's degree from the University of Utah. He went to Washington to attend The George Washington University School of Law, and during that period took a job at the fledgling BNA. BNA was conceived and established by noted newsman David Lawrence (publisher), founder of U.S. News & World Report, to report on the inner workings of Washington.

Dinwoodey was a Latter-day Saint.  He served a three-year mission in Germany for the Church of Jesus Christ of Latter-day Saints.

In 1946, when Lawrence wanted to devote his energies to the magazine, he sold BNA to his five top editors. Dean Dinwoodey, together with John D. Stewart (BNA), Ed Donnell, Adolph Magidson, and John Taylor opened up ownership in BNA to the other 279 full-time and 49 part-time employees, founding one of the nation’s first wholly employee-owned corporations.

Over the 31 years that Dinwoodey was BNA’s chief executive, he was appointed by President Harry Truman during the Korean War to serve on the three-man Salary Stabilization Board, was awarded an honorary law degree from Brigham Young University, and later received the University of Utah’s distinguished alumnus award.

He had a lifelong interest in the burgeoning body of laws that would govern intellectual property. Today, the Dinwoodey Center, part of the university’s National Law Center, sponsors research and activities on a broad range of intellectual property issues, both domestic and international.

He was the brother-in-law to Annette Richardson Dinwoodey.

Sources
page of Dinwoodey center that explains who Dinwoodey was

1899 births
1983 deaths
American Mormon missionaries in Germany
University of Utah alumni
George Washington University Law School alumni
People from Idaho Falls, Idaho
Brigham Young University people
20th-century Mormon missionaries
Latter Day Saints from Idaho
Latter Day Saints from Washington, D.C.